Stigmella tormentillella is a moth of the family Nepticulidae. It is found from Germany to the Pyrenees and Italy, and from France to Romania.

The larvae feed on Potentilla alba, Potentilla aurea, Potentilla crantzii, Potentilla erecta, Potentilla reptans and Potentilla tabernaemontani. They mine the leaves of their host plant. The mine consists of a corridor that widens significantly at the end and may occupy an entire leaf segment. The frass is initially concentrated in an uninterrupted central line, but becomes irregularly scattered at the end of the mine.

External links
Fauna Europaea
bladmineerders.nl

Nepticulidae
Moths of Europe
Moths described in 1860